Kretania zephyrinus   is a  butterfly found in the  East Palearctic (Central Asia) that belongs to the blues family.

Subspecies
K. z. zephyrinus Kopet-Dagh
K. z. ordubadi (Forster, 1938) Caucasus Major, Armenia (highlands), Talysh
K. z. forsteri (Bálint, 1990) Dzhungarsky Alatau Mountains
K. z. tarbagataiensis (Bálint, 1992) Saur, Tarbagatai, South Altai

Description from Seitz

zephyrinus Christ. (78 h) has zephyrinus. the black margin broader above and the ocelli of the underside larger; from Pamir and Turkestan. —

Biology
The larva feeds on Astragalus species.

See also
List of butterflies of Russia

References

Kretania